Frame Up is a 1997 Philippine action film edited and directed by Pepe Marcos. The film stars Raymart Santiago and Jessa Zaragoza. This marks the second collaboration of Raymart and Pepe, the first being the 1992 film Pacifico Guevarra.

Cast
 Raymart Santiago as Roden Sarmiento
 Jessa Zaragoza as Diane Pareno
 Efren Reyes Jr. as Dennis
 Ricardo Cepeda as Brian San Diego
 Levi Ignacio as Edison
 Manjo del Mundo as Antonio
 Celina Cortez as Tina
 Zandro Zamora as Maj. Valdemor
 Romeo Rivera as Don Benito Pareno
 Philip Supnet as Caloy
 Patrick Guzman as David
 Bianca Lapus as Maria
 Ernie Zarate as Gen. Robles

References

External links

1997 films
1997 action films
Films directed by Pepe Marcos
Filipino-language films
Philippine action films
GMA Pictures films
OctoArts Films films